Alexis Hernandez Borges (born 6 October 1991) is a Portuguese handball player for S.L. Benfica and the Portuguese national team.

He represented Portugal at the 2020 European Men's Handball Championship.

Honours
Porto
Portuguese League: 2013–14, 2014–15, 2018–19
Portuguese Cup: 2018–19
Portuguese Super Cup: 2014, 2019

Barcelona
Liga ASOBAL: 2017–18
Copa del Rey: 2017–18
Copa ASOBAL: 2017–18
Supercopa ASOBAL: 2017
IHF Super Globe: 2017

Benfica
EHF European League: 2021–22

Portugal
EHF Euro 2020 (sixth place)

References

External links

Portuguese male handball players
1991 births
Living people
Sportspeople from Havana
Expatriate handball players
Portuguese expatriate sportspeople in Spain
FC Porto handball players
FC Barcelona Handbol players
S.L. Benfica handball players
Liga ASOBAL players
Handball players at the 2020 Summer Olympics

Portuguese people of Cuban descent